White Point is a summit in the U.S. state of Oregon.

White Point was named for deposits of white rock.

References

Mountains of Jackson County, Oregon
Mountains of Oregon